"(So Tired of Standing Still We Got to) Move On", titled simply "Move On" in some releases, is a song written and recorded by James Brown. It appeared as the lead track on his 1991 album Love Over-Due and was released as a single which charted #48 R&B. Rolling Stone praised the song for its "slapping guitar groove".

References

James Brown songs
Songs written by James Brown
1991 singles
1991 songs